Wimpassing im Schwarzatale is a town in the district of Neunkirchen in the Austrian state of Lower Austria.

It lies on the main route to Vienna.

Population

References

External links
 http://www.wimpassing.at

Cities and towns in Neunkirchen District, Austria